The 1992 Big Eight men's basketball tournament was held March 13–15 at Kemper Arena in Kansas City, Missouri.

Top-seeded Kansas defeated #2 seed Oklahoma State in the championship game, 66–57, to earn the conference's automatic bid to the 1992 NCAA tournament.

Bracket

References

Tournament
Big Eight Conference men's basketball tournament
Big Eight Conference men's basketball tournament
Big Eight Conference men's basketball tournament